Crofton Vandeleur (1735 – 1794) was an Irish politician. He sat in the Irish House of Commons from 1768 to 1776 as a Member of Parliament (MP) for the borough of Ennis in County Clare.

He was the son of John Vandeleur of Kilrush and Frances Ormsby, daughter of John Ormsby of Cloghans, County Mayo. The Vandeleurs were a family of Dutch origin, who settled in Ireland in the 1630s, living first at Sixmilebridge. They moved to Kilrush in the late 1680s and became prosperous landowners in the region. They did  much to improve the town of Kilrush, but later became very unpopular due to their harsh treatment of their tenants during the Great Hunger of the 1840s.

He married Alice, second daughter of Thomas Burton of Buncraggy and Dorothy Forster, daughter of John Forster, Chief Justice of the Irish Common Pleas, and had several children, including John Ormsby Vandeleur MP, and Thomas Burton Vandeleur, a justice of the Court of King's Bench (Ireland).

References 

1735 births
1794 deaths
Members of the Parliament of Ireland (pre-1801) for County Clare constituencies
Irish MPs 1769–1776